GAINSCO is a Dallas, Texas-based holding company established in 1978 in Fort Worth, Texas by Joseph Macchia, who resigned from the enterprise in 1998 to pursue other interests.

GAINSCO's insurance operation was originally chartered as an underwriter of Commercial risks; operations that were discontinued and placed in a run-off in 2002. The Company marketed its commercial insurance through managing general agents, using “GAINSCO” and the block super-scribed letters “GA” as its primary logo identifiers. These letters were derived from the abbreviated version of the name of the company's primary insurance subsidiary at that time, General Agents Insurance Company of America, Inc. This commercial insurance company was sold in 2007.

In the late 1990s a Florida-based managing general agency and claims operation specializing in the non-standard personal automobile business established the cornerstone for GAINSCO's insurance marketing focus today. The Company completed a capital restructuring in 2005 which set the base for developing its business model. It consolidated its headquarters in Dallas,Texas in 2005.

Through its insurance brand, GAINSCO Auto Insurance®, the company specializes in minimum-limits personal auto coverage and actively distributes its nonstandard personal auto products through independent retail agents across the United States. Its insurance company subsidiary (domiciled in Texas) is MGA Insurance Company, Inc. 

Beginning in 2005, a newly created GAINSCO logo mark incorporated a rising arrow in its name to inspire a progressively upward company. Registered marks include GAINSCO Auto Insurance® and Are You Driven®.

GAINSCO’s insurance company subsidiary, MGA Insurance Company, Inc. (MGA), reported Net Premiums Written for 2020 of $320 million and had Policyholders’ Surplus of $139.4 million on December 31, 2020. MGA’s Policyholders’ Surplus grew approximately 12% in 2020 over 2019, aided by its almost $29 million in Net Income for the 2020 annual period. In addition to the strong earnings result for 2020, MGA has reported double-digit Net Income results for the past five years and positive income results for the past 13 straight years. MGA’s 5-year Compounded Annual Growth Rate of Net Income, through 2020, is over 32%. Source: NAIC Statutory Annual Statements.  

The Company in early 2011 approved the voluntary suspension of its duty to file reports with the SEC and the voluntary deregistration of its common stock.  The company was eligible to suspend its reporting obligations and deregister its common stock because there were fewer than 300 holders of record of the company's common stock. This decision resulted in expense savings and reduced reporting burdens.

The GAINSCO leadership team is deep in industry talent and expertise. Glenn Anderson, CEO, and President has enjoyed significant success over his thirty-year career in the insurance industry. A former Executive Vice President and Divisional President with USF&G, Mr. Anderson joined GAINSCO in 1998.  The company's Board of Directors and named Executive Officers own a significant majority of the outstanding common stock. 

GAINSCO's insurance operations consist of about 600 employees with about 350 employees in its Dallas home office. A separate Miami office has approximately 100 employees.  The balance of the employee population is field-based across the multiple states of operation.

In 2019, GAINSCO chose One Inc., for modernization of the outbound payment capacities of the company.

The A.M. Best rating of the insurance subsidiary has increased multiple times moving from a “Vulnerable” financial strength rating of “B-” to the current “Excellent” financial strength rating of “A-”.

On December 31 2020, State Farm Insurance announced its acquisition of GAINSCO as an owned subsidiary for $400 million.

References

External links 
 GAINSCO.com – official website
 GAINSCO Auto Insurance - agency website

Companies traded over-the-counter in the United States
Insurance companies of the United States
American companies established in 1978
Financial services companies established in 1978
Companies based in Dallas
1978 establishments in Texas